Lincoln Township is a township in Russell County, Kansas, United States. As of the 2010 United States Census, it had a population of 150.

History
Lincoln Township was organized from part of Russell Township in the 1880s. Grant Township was organized from part of Lincoln Township in 1907.

Geography
The center of Lincoln Township is located at  (38.7405671, −98.8698075) at an elevation of 1,890 feet (576 m). The township lies in the Smoky Hills region of the Great Plains. The Smoky Hill River runs in and out of the township, winding back and forth across its northern border. Landon Creek, a tributary of the river, flows northeast through the township.

According to the United States Census Bureau, Lincoln Township comprises an area of 36.13 square miles (93.6 km2), all of it land. Located in southwestern Russell County, it contains no incorporated settlements. One unincorporated community, Milberger, is located in the southwestern part of the township. Lincoln Township borders Grant Township to the north, Fairfield Township to the east, Barton County's Wheatland and Fairview Townships to the south, Winterset Township to the west, and Big Creek Township to the northwest.

Demographics

As of the 2010 census, there were 150 people, 60 households, and 44 families residing in the township. The population density was 4.2 people per square mile (1.6/km2). There were 66 housing units at an average density of 1.83 per square mile (0.71/km2). The racial makeup of the township was 96.7% White, 2.0% Native American, 0.7% Asian, and 0.7% from two or more races. Hispanic or Latino of any race were 0% of the population.

There were 60 households, out of which 33.3% had children under the age of 18 living with them, 65.0% were married couples living together, 8.3% had a female householder with no husband present, and 26.7% were non-families. 25.0% of all households were made up of individuals, and 15.0% had someone living alone who was 65 years of age or older. The average household size was 2.50, and the average family size was 2.98.

In the township, the population was spread out, with 26.7% under the age of 18, 5.9% from 18 to 24, 21.3% from 25 to 44, 24.8% from 45 to 64, and 21.3% who were 65 years of age or older. The median age was 43 years. For every 100 females, there were 89.9 males. For every 100 females age 18 and over, there were 100.0 males.

Education
Lincoln Township lies within unified school district 407, Russell County Schools.

Transportation
U.S. Route 281 runs north–south through the township, connecting to a network of mostly unpaved county roads laid out in a rough grid pattern across the township. Milberger Road, a paved county road, zigzags west and south from its junction with U.S. 281 in the north of the township, running north–south through Milberger before turning west along the county line and exiting the township. Michaelis Road runs east–west through Milberger and is paved east of its intersection with U.S. 281.

References

Townships in Russell County, Kansas
Townships in Kansas